The National Library of Uzbekistan is the legal deposit and copyright library for Uzbekistan.

History 
The State Library of the Republic of Uzbekistan was founded in 1870 as the Tashkent Public Library. In 1920 this became the State Public Library of Uzbekistan, and became the legal deposit for Turkestan publications. In 1947 was named after the Uzbek poet Ali-Shir Nava'i. On April 12, 2002 it was renamed the National Library of the Republic of Uzbekistan, receiving the status of "national" under the Decree of the President of the Republic and the Resolution of the Cabinet of Ministers.

Reading Halls
 Hall of Jaxon — foreign literature
 Hall of Nadir — valuable editions
 Hall of Uzbekistan — national literature
 Hall of Bunyodkor — scientific and technical literature
 Hall of Istikbol — youth and student reading room
 Hall of Tafakkur — main reading room
 Hall of Ilm — dissertations
 Hall of Ali-Shir Nava'i — literary heritage

References

External links 
  (in Uzbek and Russian)

Uzbekistani culture
Uzbekistan
Libraries in Uzbekistan